The Erick J. Thompson House is located in New Richmond, Wisconsin, United States. It was added to the National Register of Historic Places in 1988.

It is a two-and-a-half-story Queen Anne-style house on a rusticated stone block foundation.

It was deemed notable as "an excellent local example of the [Queen Anne] style in New Richmond. The ornamental woodwork, turret dormer, bay windows and wrap around porch all combine to give a visual tour-de-force and make this house the most elaborate example of the Queen Anne in town, on both the interior and exterior."

References

Houses completed in 1894
Houses in St. Croix County, Wisconsin
Houses on the National Register of Historic Places in Wisconsin
Queen Anne architecture in Wisconsin
National Register of Historic Places in St. Croix County, Wisconsin